Piroska Csontos (born 11 February 1994) is a Hungarian Paralympic athlete who competes in sprinting and long jump events in international level events.

References

1994 births
Living people
People from Kiskunfélegyháza
Paralympic athletes of Hungary
Hungarian female sprinters
Hungarian female long jumpers
Athletes (track and field) at the 2016 Summer Paralympics
Sportspeople from Bács-Kiskun County